Jurodidae is a family of beetles that was originally described for the extinct genus Jurodes, known from the Middle-Late Jurassic of Asia. In 1996, a living species, Sikhotealinia zhiltzovae  was discovered in the Sikhote-Alin mountains in Siberia, and assigned to this family. Their placement is uncertain, but are usually considered archostematans. In one study, Sikhotealinia and Jurodes were considered a sister group to all other archostematan beetles. However, other authors have considered them to mix characteristics of Archostemata, as well as Polyphaga and Adephaga.

Subdivision 

 Jurodes Ponomarenko 1985 
Jurodes ignoramus Ponomarenko, 1985 Ichetuy Formation, Russia, Late Jurassic (Oxfordian)
 Jurodes minor Ponomarenko, 1990 Glushkovo Formation, Russia, Late Jurassic (Tithonian)
 Jurodes daohugouensis  Dahougou, China, Middle Jurassic (Callovian)
 Jurodes pygmaeus  Dahougou, China, Callovian 
Jurodes shartegiensis Yan 2014, Shar Teeg, Mongolia, Tithonian
 Sikhotealinia 
Sikhotealinia zhiltzovae Lafer, 1996

References

Further reading

External links

 Illustration

Archostemata
Beetle families